The 2019–20 Orenburg season was the club's second season back in the Russian Premier League, the highest tier of association football in Russia, following their relegation at the end of the 2016–17, and their second in their 43-year history.

Season events
On 8 December, manager Vladimir Fedotov resigned with Konstantin Yemelyanov being appointed as his replacement.

On 17 March, the Russian Premier League postponed all league fixtures until April 10 due to the COVID-19 pandemic.

On 1 April, the Russian Football Union extended the suspension of football until 31 May.

On 15 May, the Russian Football Union announced that the Russian Premier League season would resume on 21 June.

On 22 May, manager Konstantin Yemelyanov's contract expired, with Ilshat Aitkulov being appointed as caretaker manager.

On 26 June, it was announced that Orenburg's fixture against Krasnodar scheduled for 27 June would not take place due to an outbreak of COVID-19 in the Orenburg squad, and was subsequently awarded to Krasnodar as a 3-0 technical victory.

On 1 July, the Russian Premier League announced that that afternoon's game between Orenburg and Ural Yekaterinburg had been called off due to the continued outbreak of COVID-19 within the Orenburg squad.

Squad

Out on loan

Transfers

In

Loans in

Out

Loans out

Released

Friendlies

Competitions

Premier League

Results by round

Results

League table

Russian Cup

Squad statistics

Appearances and goals

|-
|colspan="14"|Players away from the club on loan:
|-
|colspan="14"|Players who appeared for Orenburg but left during the season:

|}

Goal scorers

Clean sheets

Disciplinary record

References

FC Orenburg seasons
Orenburg